This is a list of all personnel changes for the 2009 Indian Premier League.

Retirement

Trades
Teams were reluctant to trade initially due to the troubled economic times and the general desire to concentrate on building a well-rounded team as opposed to making profits out of trades.

Signings

Pre-auction signings   

With most international players (barring members of the England squad and Indian Cricket League players) signing up for the first season on multi-season contracts, the emphasis for off-season signings for 2009 were possible up-and-coming young players from international domestic circuits. Some teams, including the Delhi Daredevils sent scouts to domestic and 'emerging player' matches held in Australia to sign up players.

Post Auction Signings
Any 'unsold' players as well as players sought after as replacements for Pakistani players who would be unable to play for their IPL team in 2009 can be signed on after the auction.

Re-signings
IPL Replacement Players, filling in for players away on national duty, and some under-19 players, were recruited with a one-year contract and hence their franchises had the choice to resign them or release them as free agents.

Withdrawals
Other players opted to withdraw from this particular season from the IPL, but have not ruled out returning in the future. In most cases, the reason for withdrawal was that the players wanted a break from the hectic international schedule. There have also been withdrawals due to injury and also Pakistanis who have had their contracts terminated or suspended due to tensions between India and Pakistan since the Mumbai Terrorist Attacks. Most withdrawals were Australian international players, for whom the IPL would be the only break between a series against Pakistan and the upcoming long tour of England which would include The Ashes series. Withdrawals included:

Auction

The 2009 Indian Premier League Players Auction was held on 6 February 2009 in Goa, India. A total of 43 players from 9 countries were shortlisted for the auction. However, only 17 of them were sold. The English duo of Kevin Pietersen and Andrew Flintoff each went for US$1.55 million, which made them the highest-paid cricketers in the IPL.

Sold players

Source:

Unsold players

  Aaron Bird
  Aiden Blizzard
  Ashley Noffke
  Brad Haddin
  Brett Geeves
  Bryce McGain
  Daniel Harris
  Dominic Thornley
  Jon Moss
  Michael Dighton
  Michael Hill
  Michael Klinger
  Phil Jaques
  Steve Smith
  Stuart Clark
  Shakib Al Hasan
  Tamim Iqbal
  Luke Wright
  Samit Patel
  James Franklin
  Andre Nel
  Ashwell Prince
  Gulam Bodi
  Morne van Wyk
  Yusuf Abdulla
  Chamara Kapugedera
  Kaushalya Weeraratne
  Nuwan Kulasekara
  Prasanna Jayawardene
  Kemar Roach
  Ramnaresh Sarwan
  Daren Powell

References

2009 Indian Premier League
Indian Premier League personnel changes